Archery at the 2014 South American Games was held at the Parque Deportivo Peñalolén in Santiago, Chile from March 12 to 15, 2014. Five competitions were held in men, women and mixed recurve.

Medalists

Medal table

Participating nations
A total of 41 archers from 8 nations competed in archery at the 2014 South American Games:

 (7)
 (6)
 (7)
 (7)
 (3)
 (2)
 (1)
 (8)

References

External links
Archery results – 2014 South American Games

2014
South American Games
2014 South American Games events